Leonard Murphy (23 November 1909 – 20 December 1996) was an Australian rules footballer who played with Collingwood and Footscray in the Victorian Football League (VFL). His older brother Frank played beside him for much of his career.

Football
Murphy played mainly in the ruck and was a member of a Collingwood side which was a force in the VFL during the 1930s.

They had just won a premiership when he joined the club and his debut season of 1928 saw them go back to back, with Murphy kicking two goals in their grand final win over Richmond. Collingwood won the flag again in 1929 and 1930 with Murphy a member of both premiership sides. He missed out on the 1935 premiership after being injured and again the following year due to suspension. 

At the end of 1937 he left the club and joined Nhill as captain-coach. 

He returned to Melbourne and served as captain-coach of Victorian Football Association club Oakleigh in 1939, before making a return to the league in 1940 with Footscray.

Notes

External links

Len Murphy's playing statistics from The VFA Project

1909 births
1996 deaths
Australian rules footballers from Victoria (Australia)
Australian Rules footballers: place kick exponents
Williamstown Football Club players
Collingwood Football Club players
Collingwood Football Club Premiership players
Western Bulldogs players
Nhill Football Club players
Oakleigh Football Club players
Oakleigh Football Club coaches
Three-time VFL/AFL Premiership players